Vladislav Georgiyevich Kamilov (born 29 August 1995) is a Russian football central midfielder. He plays for FC Akhmat Grozny.

Club career
He made his debut in the Russian Second Division for FC Dynamo Barnaul on 22 April 2013 in a game against FC Yakutiya Yakutsk.

He made his Russian Football National League debut for FC Volgar Astrakhan on 19 March 2017 in a game against FC Neftekhimik Nizhnekamsk.

On 21 August 2020, he joined Russian Premier League club FC Ufa. He made his Russian Premier League debut for Ufa on 26 September 2020 in a game against FC Zenit Saint Petersburg.

On 4 September 2022, Kamilov signed a three-year contract with FC Akhmat Grozny.

Career statistics

References

External links
 
 
 
 

1995 births
People from Altai Krai
Living people
Russian footballers
Russia youth international footballers
Association football midfielders
FC Dynamo Barnaul players
FC Rostov players
FC Nosta Novotroitsk players
FC Volgar Astrakhan players
FC Shinnik Yaroslavl players
FC SKA-Khabarovsk players
FC Ufa players
FC Akhmat Grozny players
Russian Premier League players
Russian First League players
Russian Second League players
Sportspeople from Altai Krai